Rich Scangarello (born April 15, 1972) is an American football coach who most recently was the offensive coordinator for the University of Kentucky. He was previously a quarterbacks coach for the San Francisco 49ers. He has also spent time as the offensive coordinator for the Denver Broncos and an assistant coach for the Oakland Raiders, Atlanta Falcons and Philadelphia Eagles.

Coaching career

Early coaching career
From 1998 to 1999, Scangarello served as a graduate assistant at UC Davis. He also served as a graduate assistant at Idaho in 2000. In 2001, Scangarello served as offensive coordinator at Carleton. From 2002 to 2003, Scangarello returned to UC Davis as their quarterbacks coach. In 2004, he returned to UC Davis as wide receivers coach. Scangarello was promoted to co-offensive coordinator in 2008

Oakland Raiders
In 2009, Scangarello was hired by the Oakland Raiders as an offensive quality control coach. He replaced Mark Costagliola.

Millsaps
In 2010, Scangarello was hired by Millsaps as their assistant head coach, offensive coordinator, and quarterbacks coach.

Northern Arizona
In 2012, Scangarello was hired by Northern Arizona as their offensive coordinator and quarterbacks coach.

Atlanta Falcons
In 2015, Scangarello was hired by the Atlanta Falcons as an offensive quality control coach.

Wagner
In 2016, Scangarello was hired by Wagner as their offensive coordinator.

San Francisco 49ers
In 2017, Scangarello was hired by the San Francisco 49ers as their quarterbacks coach.

Denver Broncos
On January 16, 2019, Scangarello was hired by the Denver Broncos as their offensive coordinator. On January 12, 2020, Scangarello was fired by head coach Vic Fangio after Denver finished last in several offensive categories.

Philadelphia Eagles
On February 5, 2020, Scangarello was hired by the Philadelphia Eagles as a senior offensive assistant.

San Francisco 49ers (second stint)
Scangarello was named the quarterbacks coach for the San Francisco 49ers in 2021.

Kentucky
On February 25, 2022, it was reported that Scangarello would be hired as Offensive Coordinator at the University of Kentucky.  He was fired on November 29, 2022.

References

1972 births
Denver Broncos coaches
Living people
Sacramento State Hornets football players
UC Davis Aggies football coaches
Idaho Vandals football coaches
Carleton Knights football coaches
Millsaps Majors football coaches
Northern Arizona Lumberjacks football coaches
Wagner Seahawks football coaches
Oakland Raiders coaches
Atlanta Falcons coaches
San Francisco 49ers coaches
Philadelphia Eagles coaches
Kentucky Wildcats football coaches